David Thimothy Harper (September 7, 1917 – January 15, 1996) was an American Negro league outfielder in the 1940s.

A native of Conley, Georgia, Harper attended Clark College. He made his Negro leagues debut playing for several teams in 1943. Harper spent 1944 and 1945 with the Kansas City Monarchs, and finished his career with the Birmingham Black Barons in 1946. He died in Atlanta, Georgia in 1996 at age 78.

References

External links
 and Baseball-Reference Black Baseball stats and Seamheads
 David T. Harper at Negro League Baseball Players Association

1917 births
1996 deaths
Atlanta Black Crackers players
Birmingham Black Barons players
Cincinnati Clowns players
Kansas City Monarchs players
Philadelphia Stars players
Baseball outfielders
Baseball players from Atlanta
People from Clayton County, Georgia
20th-century African-American sportspeople